HMS Talisman has been the name of more than one ship of the British Royal Navy, and may refer to:

, a destroyer originally named HMS Talisman but renamed Louis while under construction
, one of four s, taken over by the Royal Navy during the First World War
, a submarine commissioned in 1940 and sunk in 1942

Royal Navy ship names